31st AVN Awards was an event during which Adult Video News (AVN) presented its annual AVN Awards to honor the best pornographic movies and adult entertainment products of 2013.

The ceremony was held January 18, 2014, at The Joint in the Hard Rock Hotel and Casino, Paradise, Nevada. Movies or products released between October 1, 2012, and October 7, 2013, were eligible. Comedian/actress Rebekah Kochan and adult movie actresses Chanel Preston, who was co-winner of "Most Outrageous Sex Scene", and Samantha Saint hosted the AVN Awards. The awards show was held immediately after the Adult Entertainment Expo at the same venue.

Underworld took top honors as Movie of the Year, also winning Best Drama and seven other awards, including a directing award for Brad Armstrong.

Tommy Pistol was named Best Actor for his performance as Ashley J. Williams in adult horror film Evil Head. The coveted AVN Female Performer of the Year Award and AVN Best New Starlet Award went to Bonnie Rotten and Mia Malkova respectively. Axel Braun won Director of the Year for a record fourth consecutive time and Manuel Ferrara was awarded a record fifth Male Performer of the Year award. The new category of BBW Performer of the Year was won by April Flores. The Clever Title of the Year award was won by Seymore Butts for Cirque du Hole-A.

Winners and nominees 

The categories for the 31st AVN Awards were released on September 20, 2013 and the finalists were announced on November 15, 2013.

Major awards 
Winners of categories announced during the awards ceremony January 18, 2014, are highlighted in boldface.

Additional Award Winners 
These awards were not presented during the awards ceremony itself but were announced before or after the show. In addition, Best 3D Release, Best Classic Release and Best Selling Title of the Year were on the list of award categories but were not presented in 2014.

Video Categories

 Best All-Girl Group Sex Scene: Gracie Glam, Mia Malkova & Raven Rockette (Meow! 3)
 Best All-Girl Release: Meow! 3
 Best All-Girl Series: Belladonna: No Warning
 Best All-Sex Release: Slutty and Sluttier 18
 Best Amateur Release: 100% Real Swingers: Meet the Rileys
 Best Amateur Series: College Rules
 Best Anal Release: Wet Asses 2
 Best Anal Series: Evil Anal
 Best Art Direction: Underworld
 Best Big Bust Release: Bra Busters 4
 Best Big Bust Series: Big and Real
 Best Big Butt Release: Big Wet Asses 22
 Best Big Butt Series: Phat Ass White Girls
 Best Cinematography: Francois Clousot (Underworld)
 Best Comedy: Band Sluts
 Best Continuing Series: Slutty and Sluttier
 Best Director – Feature: Brad Armstrong (Underworld)
 Best Director – Foreign Feature: Max Candy & Michael Ninn (The Ingenuous)
 Best Director – Foreign Non-Feature: Tanya Hyde (The House of Sin)
 Best Director – Non-Feature: Mason (Anikka)
 Best Director – Parody: Will Ryder (Not The Wizard of Oz XXX)
 Best Double-Penetration Sex Scene: Skin Diamond, Marco Banderas & Prince Yahshua (Skin)
 Best DVD Extras: The New Behind the Green Door
 Best Editing: Scott Allen (Underworld)
 Best Educational Release: Jessica Drake’s Guide to Wicked Sex: Anal Play for Men
 Best Ethnic Release – Asian: Asian Bombshells
 Best Ethnic Release – Black: Big Black Wet Asses 13
 Best Ethnic Release – Latin: Butthole Barrio Bitches 2
 Best Ethnic Series: 8th Street Latinas
 Best Fem-Dom Strap-On Release: Strap Attack 17
 Best Foot/Leg Fetish Release: Foot Fanatic
 Best Foreign Feature: The Ingenuous
 Best Foreign Non-Feature: Claire Castel: The Chambermaid
 Best Foreign Continuing Series: Slutty Girls Love Rocco
 Best Gonzo Release: Remy LaCroix’s Anal Cabo Weekend
 Best Group Sex Scene: Bonnie Rotten, Karlo Karrera, Tony DeSergio, Mick Blue & Jordan Ash (The Gang Bang of Bonnie Rotten)
 Best Interracial Release: Lex Turns Evil
 Best Interracial Series: Mandingo Massacre
 Best Makeup: Melissa Makeup (Evil Head)
 Best Marketing Campaign – Individual Project: Farrah Superstar: Backdoor Teen Mom (Vivid Celeb)
 Best MILF Release: MILF Revolution
 Best MILF Series: My Friend's Hot Mom
 Best Music Soundtrack: Grease XXX: A Parody
 Best New Line: Skow for Girlfriends Films
 Best New Series: Wet Asses
 Best Non-Sex Performance: Kyle Stone (Hotel No Tell)
 Best Older Woman/Younger Girl Release: Cougars, Kittens & Cock 2
 Best Oral Release: American Cocksucking Sluts 3
 Best Oral Series: Deep Throat This
 Best Orgy/Gangbang Release: Gangbanged 5
 Best Original Song: "Queen of Munchkin Land" by Jeff Mullen (Not The Wizard of Oz XXX)
 Best Packaging: Underworld (Wicked Pictures)
 Best POV Release: The Hooker Experience
 Best POV Series: Tanlines
 Best POV Sex Scene: Kennedy Leigh & Jules Jordan (Ultimate Fuck Toy: Kennedy Leigh)
 Best Pro-Am Release: Brand New Faces 42
 Best Pro-Am Series: Bang Bus
 Best Safe Sex Scene: Jessica Drake & Brad Armstrong (Sexpionage: The Drake Chronicles)
 Best Screenplay: Brad Armstrong (Underworld)
 Best Screenplay – Parody: David Stanley (Clerks XXX: A Porn Parody)
 Best Solo Release: All Natural Glamour Solos 3
 Best Solo Sex Scene: Maddy O'Reilly (Not The Wizard of Oz XXX)
 Best Special Effects: Iron Man XXX: An Axel Braun Parody
 Best Specialty Release – Other Genre: Evil BBW Gold 3
 Best Specialty Series – Other Genre: Evil BBW Gold
 Best Squirting Release: Squirt Gasms!

Video Categories (continued)

 Best Supporting Actor: Xander Corvus (Underworld)
 Best Supporting Actress: Brandy Aniston (Not The Wizard of Oz XXX)
 Best Tease Performance: Anikka Albrite (Anikka)
 Best Three-Way Sex Scene – Boy/Boy/Girl: Anikka Albrite, James Deen & Ramón Nomar (Anikka)
 Best Three-Way Sex Scene – Girl/Girl/Boy: Remy LaCroix, Riley Reid & Manuel Ferrara (Remy 2)
 Best Transsexual Release: Rogue Adventures 38
 Best Transsexual Series: American She-Male X
 Best Transsexual Sex Scene: Zoey Monroe & Jacqueline Woods (Rogue Adventures 38)
 Best Vignette Release: Show No Mercy
 Best Wall-to-Wall Release: Performers of the Year 2013
 Best Young Girl Release: The Innocence of Youth 5
 Best Young Girl Series: Cuties
 Clever Title of the Year: Cirque du Hole-A
 Most Outrageous Sex Scene: Chanel Preston & Ryan Madison ("Give Me Strength" - Get My Belt)

Video Body of Work Categories

 All-Girl Performer of the Year: Shyla Jennings
 BBW Performer of the Year: April Flores
 Best Male Newcomer: Ike Diezel
 Best Marketing Campaign – Company Image: Evil Angel
 Best New Studio: Hard X/Erotica X
 Female Foreign Performer of the Year: Anissa Kate
 Mainstream Star of the Year: James Deen
 Male Foreign Performer of the Year: Rocco Siffredi
 MILF Performer of the Year: India Summer
 Unsung Male Performer of the Year: Voodoo
 Unsung Female Performer of the Year: Presley Hart

Fan Awards Categories

 Best Body: Jayden Jaymes
 Best Boobs: Kagney Linn Karter
 Favorite Female Porn Star: Riley Steele
 Favorite Male Porn Star: James Deen
 Favorite Studio: Brazzers
 Favorite Webcam Girl: LittleRedBunny
 Hottest MILF: Lisa Ann
 Most Promising New Starlet: Christy Mack
 Social Media Star: Lexi Belle

Pleasure Products Categories

 Best Condom Manufacturer: Trojan
 Best Enhancement Manufacturer: Sensuva
 Best Fetish Manufacturer: Sportsheets
 Best Lingerie or Apparel Manufacturer: Coquette International
 Best Lubricant Manufacturer: Wicked Sensual Care
 Best Pleasure Product Manufacturer – Small: OhMiBod
 Best Pleasure Product Manufacturer – Medium: LELO
 Best Pleasure Product Manufacturer – Large: Sportsheets
 Best Product Line for Men: Fleshlight
 Best Product Line for Women: JOPEN

Retail and Distribution Categories

 Best Adult Distributor: Entrenue
 Best Boutique: The Tool Shed (Milwaukee, WI)
 Best Retail Chain – Small: Fairvilla Megastore
 Best Retail Chain – Large: Hustler Hollywood
 Best Web Retail Store: AdamEve.com

Web & Technology Categories

 Best Affiliate Program: Gamma Entertainment
 Best Alternative Website: Kink.com
 Best Dating Website: AmateurMatch.com
 Best Glamour Website: AndrewBlake.com
 Best Live Chat Website: MyFreeCams.com
 Best Membership Website: EvilAngel.com
 Best Porn Star Website: Asa Akira (AsaAkira.com) & Joanna Angel (JoannaAngel.com) [tie]
 Best Solo Girl Website: Vicky Vette (VickyAtHome.com)
 Best Studio Website: EvilAngelVideo.com
 Best Web Director: Brando
 Best Web Premiere: Public Disgrace 31515 (Kink.com)

Honorary AVN Awards 
The Reuben Sturman Award for battling for industry rights was not presented in 2014.

Visionary Award 
Wicked Pictures founder Steve Orenstein was chosen to receive the third annual Visionary Award for "ethics, civic responsibility, an eye for quality and innovation, and a compassionate understanding of adult entertainment and its place in mainstream society".

Hall of Fame 
The AVN Awards Hall of Fame inductees, "all of whom have attained not only longevity but also something more important: memorable achievements in front of the camera, behind the camera and back in the office," for 2014 were:
Founders Branch: Kevin Beechum, founder of content production/distribution company K-Beech; Ted Blitt, founder of Mile High Media; Morty Gordon, founder of Bizarre Video.
Video Branch: Barrett Blade, producer Shylar Cobi, Digital Playground director Robby D., Stormy Daniels, Ben English, Melissa Hill, Mike John, Katsuni, Scott Lyons, Nick Manning, Eric Masterson, Mr. Pete, director Bobby Rinaldi, Taylor St. Claire & Wendy Williams.
Executive Branch: Distributor Jerry E. of Juicy Entertainment and Exquisite Multimedia, Adam H. of Pleasure Productions, and Ed Kail & Marty Turkel.
Pleasure Product Branch: Lavi Yedid of NS Novelties; Robert Pyne Sr., founder of distribution company Williams Trading; and Rachel Venning & Claire Cavanah of adult retailer Babeland.
Internet Founders Branch: Angie Rowntree, founder of Sssh.com; Freeones.com founder Maurice; Mark "Greenguy" Jenkins of Link-O-Rama.com.

Multiple awards and nominations 

The following releases received multiple awards:
 9 awards: Underworld
 5 awards: Anikka
 4 awards: Not The Wizard of Oz XXX
 3 awards: The Ingenuous
 2 awards: Grease XXX: A Parody, Meow! 3, Rogue Adventures 38 & Skin

The following releases received the most nominations:
 17 nominations: Underworld
 16 nominations: Not The Wizard of Oz XXX
 12 nominations: Man of Steel XXX

The following individuals received multiple awards:
 3 awards: Anikka Albrite, Brad Armstrong, James Deen, Remy LaCroix & Riley Reid
 2 awards: Bonnie Rotten, Manuel Ferrara, Mia Malkova, Mick Blue & Skin Diamond

The following individuals received the most nominations (includes fan voting nominations & excludes producer nominations):
 17 nominations: Anikka Albrite & James Deen
 15 nominations: Joanna Angel & Ramón Nomar
 14 nominations: Bonnie Rotten & Mick Blue
 13 nominations: Remy LaCroix & Tommy Pistol
 12 nominations: Riley Reid
 11 nominations: Allie Haze, Chanel Preston & Skin Diamond
 10 nominations: Axel Braun, Christy Mack, Dani Daniels, Manuel Ferrara, Mia Malkova & Prince Yahshua

Presenters and performers 
The following individuals were presenters or performers during the awards ceremony:

Presenters

Trophy girls 

 Evi Fox
 Emily Austin

Performers

Ceremony information 
With the strong showing in awards categories by feature movies, Adult Video News proclaimed them alive and well: "Despite mumbling that features and parodies have run their course, several were big winners this year, including Underworld, Grease XXX, Temptation of Eve and Man of Steel XXX."

Changes to awards categories 
Beginning with the 31st AVN Awards, several new categories were introduced to reflect evolving market trends, including:
 Best Safe Sex Scene
 Best Condom Manufacturer
 All-Girl Performer of the Year 
 BBW Performer of the Year
 Best Web Director

Meanwhile, the Best Photography Website category was renamed Best Glamour Website "to include sites that also feature glamorous video content." Unsung Starlet of the Year was renamed Unsung Female Performer of the Year, Best New Production Company became Best New Studio and Crossover Star of the Year became Mainstream Star of the Year.

Fan vote categories increased from four to 10 and the categories themselves were completely changed, from Favorite Body, Twitter Queen, Favorite Porn Star and Best Free Adult Website, to the following:

 Best Body
 Best Boobs
 Favorite Porn Star (Female)
 Favorite Porn Star (Male)
 Favorite Studio
 Favorite Web Cam Girl

 Hottest Ass
 Hottest MILF
 Most Promising New Starlet
 Social Media Star (which includes Twitter, Facebook and Instagram)

AVN also added another category to its Hall of Fame: "the Executive Branch, for key members of the industry who work behind the scenes" such as in sales, marketing or education.

Best Celebrity Sex Tape and Best Internal Release were dropped on this year's list of categories.

Reception and review 
Some media outlets were critical of the show. Robin Leach of the Las Vegas Sun reported he was told attendance was down and the entertainment was terrible.

Richard Abowitz, who covers the adult industry for The Daily Beast termed the show "lackluster", noting, "Though long-billed as the Academy Awards for the adult industry, few take that label seriously anymore. The massive decline in the porn industry’s fortunes thanks to regulatory challenges and piracy and the infinity of sex offerings on the Internet have left the remains of the mainstream porn industry closer to the cheesy and sleazy parody of the other Hollywood that defined porn’s golden era of the '80s."

ExpressMilwaukee sexuality blogger Laura Anne Stuart expressed mixed feelings about the new BBW Performer of the Year award category: "On one hand, I’m glad that the most well-known adult industry awards are recognizing that larger women are sexy and sexual. On the other hand, this probably means that the Best Actress and Female Performer of the Year categories will continue to be won by skinny people with preternaturally large boobs and/or butts."

In Memoriam 
As the show was beginning, AVN used a segment to pay a tribute to adult-industry personalities who had died since the 2013 awards show, including Screw publisher Al Goldstein and producer/distributor Morty Gordon.

See also

 Adult Video News Awards
 AVN Award for Male Performer of the Year
 AVN Female Performer of the Year Award
 AVN Award for Male Foreign Performer of the Year
 AVN Best New Starlet Award
 List of members of the AVN Hall of Fame

Notes

External links

 Complete list of nominees, fan favourite nominees and winners
 2014 AVN Award Nominees
 Adult Video News Awards at the IMDb
 
 2014 AVN Award Winners at the Internet Adult Film Database
 Trailer for Best Movie Underworld at YouTube

AVN Awards
AVN Awards 31